Don Juan is a 1913 Dutch silent drama film directed by Léon Boedels.

Cast
 Willem van der Veer as Don Juan
 Caroline van Dommelen		
 Tilly Lus		
 Constant van Kerckhoven Jr.

References

External links 
 

1913 films
Dutch silent films
Dutch black-and-white films
1913 drama films
Films based on the Don Juan legend
Dutch drama films
Silent drama films